Shah Azizur Rahman (23 November 1925 – 1 September 1989) was a Bangladeshi politician who served as the Prime Minister of Bangladesh. However, he was the subject of considerable controversy for his collaboration with the Pakistan Army against the struggle to Independence of Bangladesh.

Early life
Shah Azizur Rahman was born in Kushtia, Bengal (now in Bangladesh) on 23 November 1925. He received his Bachelor of arts degree in English Language and Literature from Calcutta University and went on to study at Dhaka University. He held the position of general secretary in All Bengal Muslim Student League from 1945 to 1947. As a student political leader, Rahman participated in the Bengal Provincial Muslim League and the Pakistan movement. After the partition of India he served as joint secretary of East Pakistan Muslim League. He was opposed to the Bengali Language movement of 1952. He would remain active in Bengali and national politics in Pakistan, becoming a vocal opponent of Bengali leader Sheikh Mujibur Rahman and his Awami League, which advocated greater autonomy for East Pakistan.

Political career
Rahman was the general secretary of the East Pakistan Muslim League from 1952 to 1958. In 1962 he participated in the Pakistan National Assembly elections from Kushtia but lost. He joined the National Democratic Front led by Huseyn Shaheed Suhrawardy in 1962. In March 1964 he joined the Awami League and was subsequently elected vice-president of the Pakistan Awami League. In 1965 he was elected to the National Assembly from Kushtia and served as the deputy leader of the opposition from 1965 to 1969. He was one of the defense lawyers in the Agartala conspiracy case. At the outbreak of the Bangladesh Liberation War, Rahman supported the Pakistani state forces and denounced the Bengali nationalist struggle. He led the Pakistani delegation to the United Nations in November 1971, where he would emphatically deny that the Pakistan Army's Operation Searchlight had degenerated into genocide. In 1971, following the defeat of Pakistan in the Bangladesh Liberation War, Rahman was arrested under the collaborators act but was released in 1973 under a general amnesty by President Sheikh Mujib. In the post-war period, authorities estimated that over a million people had been killed in Bangladesh by Pakistani state forces and collaborating militias. Rahman would continue to lobby Muslim nations in the Middle East to decline diplomatic recognition to Bangladesh.

After the assassination of Sheikh Mujib, he joined the revived Muslim League in Bangladesh in 1976. He then joined the newly founded Bangladesh Nationalist Party of President Ziaur Rahman in 1978 and was made the minister of labor and industry in Rahmans cabinet. When Ziaur Rahman had become the President of Bangladesh, he initially decided to appoint Mashiur Rahman Jadu Mia as prime minister, but after Mashiur's sudden death on 12 March 1979, Shah Azizur Rahman was appointed to the office on 15 April 1979. It is believed that Ziaur Rahman preferred candidates such as Badruddoza Chowdhury or Saifur Rahman for the job. However, he also wanted the party's parliamentarians to choose their leader through a secret ballot, which the Shah Aziz managed to win so that Ziaur Rahman could not ignore him.

As prime minister, Shah Azizur Rahman helped ratify the infamous Indemnity Act promulgated by Khondaker Mostaq Ahmed. Shah Azizur Rahman also helped Zia organize the Bangladesh Nationalist Party, which won the 1979 parliamentary elections. After the assassination of Ziaur Rahman in 1981, Shah Azizur Rahman continued to serve as prime minister. Although he was retained in that post by the new President Abdus Sattar, both Sattar and Rahman were overthrown in a military coup led by army chief Hossain Mohammad Ershad in 1982.

Death
Rahman died in Dhaka on 1 September 1989 at the age of 63.

See also 

 Azizur Rahman ministry

References

External links
 
 Bangladesh Observer

1925 births
1989 deaths
Bangladesh Nationalist Party politicians
Prime Ministers of Bangladesh
2nd Jatiya Sangsad members
Pakistani MNAs 1965–1969
20th-century Bengalis
People from Kushtia District